Yonca-Onuk Shipyard is a Turkish shipyard established in Istanbul, Turkey in 1985. It builds fast patrol boats for the defence and law enforcement missions.

History
The history of the building fast patrol craft goes back to 1985 when Dr. Ekber Onuk, an aviation engineer, and his partner Şakir Yılmaztürk decided to establish the Yonca-Onuk Shipyard to enter shipbuilding industry. Ekber Onuk's son Kaan, also an aviation engineer, who spent his childhood at the shipyard, built in 1989, a -long boat, named Yontech 45. An enclosed top version designed by Nissan called Yontech 105, was awarded the bronze medal by the Industrial Design Society of America in 1992. In 1993, father and son Onuk decided to start a project called "Multi Role Tactical Platform" (MRTP) of
developing a  longer fast craft for armed military missions. Kaan's classmate from the university and ship designer Erdoğan Ertekin joined the team. The project came to standstill when the 22-year-old Kaan died in a road accident, and his sorrowed father stopped the works.

In 1996, the Undersecretariat for Defence issued an  international invitation to tender for the procurement of six fast patrol boats for the Turkish Coast Guard. Şakir Yılmaztürk convinced Ekber Onuk to resume the project. The fast patrol boat Onuk MRTP-15 won the bid. The first Onuk MRTP-15 was launched in June 1998. The vessels were named Kaan-class by the Turkish Coast Gard commemorating the late boat designer.

Products
Works continued following the building of the first fast patrol boat. The shipyard exported its products to Georgia, United Arab Emirates, Pakistan and Malaysia. The product range cover eight different fast patrol craft and fast patrol/attack boats from -long MRTP 12  of speed plus  to -long MRTP 49  of  speed plus . The shipyard has delivered a total of 165 boats in different classes to 12 government organizations in 9 countries.

The patrol boats are fitted with different type of armament, such as the  Aselsan 12.7 mm stabilized machine (STAMP), Aselsan stabilized turret 25/30 mm STOP, short range Surface-to-Ship Missile (SSM), Surface-to-Air Missile (SAM), and 40 mm Stinger Barrel Gun.

Coast Guard and Navy vessels

References

Shipyards of Turkey
Turkish companies established in 1985
Defence companies of Turkey
Shipbuilding companies of Turkey
Manufacturing companies based in Istanbul
Tuzla, Istanbul